The Family Friendly Programming Forum is a coalition of over 40 advertisers, all of whom belong to the Association of National Advertisers.  They seek to increase the amount of "family-friendly" programming on U.S. television.

They define family-friendly programming as:

It is relevant to today's TV viewer, has generational appeal, depicts real life and is appropriate in theme, content and language for a broad family audience. Family friendly programs also embody a responsible resolution. Family friendly programs may include movies, dramas, situation comedies and informational programs.

The FFPF supports various programs and initiatives:

 Script Development Fund
 Student Scholarship Program
 Annual Symposium
 Family Television Awards 

Projects that the script-development fund has helped reach the pilot stage include: 

Gilmore Girls
Life Is Wild
The 2007 reboot of Bionic Woman
Chuck
Ugly Betty
Friday Night Lights
Brothers & Sisters
Everybody Hates Chris
Notes from the Underbelly
Runaway
Commander in Chief
The New Adventures of Old Christine
Related
Complete Savages
Clubhouse
8 Simple Rules for Dating My Teenage Daughter
American Dreams
Big Time

The fund has no influence on the direction of the show further than the pilot.

External links 

Official homepage

Television organizations in the United States